Gazgazareh-ye Sofla (also Romanized as Gazgazāreh-ye Soflá and Gaz Gezāreh-ye Soflá; also known as Gazgazāreh Pāin, Gazgazār-e Pā’īn, Gaz Gazār-e Pā’īn, Gaz Gezareh Pā’īn, and Gaz Gezāreh-ye Pā’īn) is a village in Sis Rural District, Bolbanabad District, Dehgolan County, Kurdistan Province, Iran. At the 2006 census, its population was 243, in 63 families. The village is populated by Kurds.

References 

Towns and villages in Dehgolan County
Kurdish settlements in Kurdistan Province